Celestine is an unincorporated community in Hall Township, Dubois County, in the U.S. state of Indiana.

In 2008, the estimated population of Celestine was 250. The community is home to a Roman Catholic church.

History
Celestine was platted in 1843. It was named for Rt. Rev. Celestine Rene Lawrence De La Hailandiere, second bishop of the Roman Catholic Diocese of Vincennes, Indiana. The Celestine post office was established in 1851.

On February 28, 2011, a tornado touched down and damaged two homes and a double-wide trailer, the National Weather Service stated.

Schools
Celestine is home to Celestine Elementary School. After students complete elementary school, They then attend the Northeast Dubois Middle School to Highschool.

Geography

Climate
The climate in this area is characterized by hot, humid summers and generally mild to cool winters.  According to the Köppen Climate Classification system, Celestine has a humid subtropical climate, abbreviated "Cfa" on climate maps.

References

External links

Unincorporated communities in Dubois County, Indiana
Unincorporated communities in Indiana
Jasper, Indiana micropolitan area
1843 establishments in Indiana
Populated places established in 1843